Enrique Dawi (1927 - 1988) was an Argentine  film director and screenplay writer.

He worked mainly in the Cinema of Argentina and was at his peak in the 1970s and 1980s. He directed Adios Roberto in 1985.

References

1927 births
1988 deaths
Argentine film directors
Male screenwriters
20th-century Argentine screenwriters
20th-century Argentine male writers